Dadaab is a constituency in Kenya. It is one of six constituencies in Garissa County.

References 

Constituencies in Garissa County